Cecil Porter Vaughan (May 11, 1919 – July 30, 2008) was a pitcher in Major League Baseball who played for the Philadelphia Athletics. He was in the military during World War II from 1942 to 1945.

References

External links

1919 births
2008 deaths
Major League Baseball pitchers
Philadelphia Athletics players
Toronto Maple Leafs (International League) players
Kansas City Blues (baseball) players
Baseball players from Virginia
American military personnel of World War II
Richmond Spiders baseball players
People from King and Queen County, Virginia